The 2018 Coupe nationale du Niger is the 43rd edition of the Coupe nationale du Niger, the knockout football competition of Niger.

Round 1
[May 20]

Entente FC (Dosso)	     		 lt  Akokana FC d' Arlit (Agadez)

[May 22]

Representant de Zinder       		 lt  AS Université AM (Niamey)

AS Garde Nationale (Niamey)  		 5-0 Wombeye FC (Maradi)

AS Forces Armées Nigériennes (Niamey)	 lt  US Gendarmerie Nationale (Niamey)

[May 23]

Soniantcha FC (Tillabery)    		 lt  Dan Gourmou (Tahoua)

Jangorzo FC (Maradi)	     		 8-1 Espoir FC (Zinder)

Olympic FC (Niamey)	     		 1-1 AS Douanes (Niamey)		[3-4 pen]

Urana FC d' Arlit (Agadez)   		 bt  Arewa FC de Doutchi (Dosso)

AS Forage (Niamey)	     		 1-4 Racing FC (Niamey)

Azzura FC (Zinder)	     		 0-3 Sahel Sporting Club (Niamey)

[May 24]

Atlantique (Maradi)	     		 0-3 ASN NIGELEC (Niamey)

AS ZAM (Niamey)				 bt  AS Tsunami FTC (Niamey)

National Dendi (Dosso)	     		 0-7 JS Tahoua

[May 25]

Nassara de Tessaoua (Maradi)   		 0-8 Nassara AC (Agadez)

[Jun 6]

Lantarki (Agadez)	    		 lt  AS SONIDEP (Niamey)

Barka FC (Diffa)	     		 lt  AS Police (Niamey)

Round 2
[Jun 10]

US Gendarmerie Nationale (Niamey)	 0-1 Racing FC (Niamey)

[Jun 12]

AS Douanes (Niamey)			 0-0 AS Police (Niamey)			[4-5 pen]

AS SONIDEP (Niamey)			 2-1 AS ZAM (Niamey)

[Jun 13]

Urana FC d' Arlit (Agadez)		 drw AS Université AM (Niamey)		[AS Université on pen]

Nassara AC (Agadez)			 1-3 Jangorzo FC (Maradi)

[Jun 16]

JS Tahoua				 0-1 Sahel Sporting Club (Niamey)

ASN NIGELEC (Niamey)			 2-1 Dan Gourmou (Tahoua)

[Jun 17]

AS Garde Nationale (Niamey)		 2-1 Akokana FC d' Arlit (Agadez)

Quarterfinals
[Jul 7]

AS Garde Nationale (Niamey)		 2-1 AS SONIDEP (Niamey)

[Jul 8]

AS Université AM (Niamey)		 0-2 Racing FC (Niamey)

Sahel Sporting Club (Niamey)		 1-3 Jangorzo FC (Maradi)

[Jul 10]

ASN NIGELEC (Niamey)			 drw AS Police (Niamey)			[5-3 pen]

Semifinals
First leg

[Jul 15]

Jangorzo FC (Maradi)			2-3 Racing FC (Niamey)

[Jul 19]

ASN NIGELEC (Niamey)			0-1 AS Garde Nationale (Niamey)

Second leg

[Jul 22]

AS Garde Nationale (Niamey)		2-0 ASN NIGELEC (Niamey)		[3-0 agg]

[Jul 26]

Racing FC (Niamey)			2-1 Jangorzo FC (Maradi)		[5-3 agg]

Final
[Aug 3, Stade Régional, Maradi]

AS Garde Nationale (Niamey)		0-0 Racing FC (Niamey)			[5-4 pen]

See also
2017–18 Niger Premier League

References

Niger
Cup
Football competitions in Niger